Hàn River bridge is a cable-stayed swing bridge in Da Nang, Vietnam.  Da Nang lies on the west side of the Hàn River and the beaches are to the east. 

In the middle of the night, traffic is stopped from crossing the Song Han Bridge and it swings on its axis to allow shipping traffic to pass along the river. The bridge is lit up brightly at night.

History
The Song Han Bridge was built by the people of Da Nang. It is the first swing bridge to be built in Vietnam. The bridge is an important part of Danang's cityscape.

Bribery and Corruption case
Shortly after the bridge was completed, the contractor, Phạm Minh Thông, was arrested. He was charged and jailed for stealing money from the project and for bribery, but the men who took the bribes were never revealed.

According to Radio Free Asia, the People's Procuracy of Da Nang City concluded in the Document No. 73/KSDT-KT (October, 2000) and Document No. 77/KSDT/KT (November 2000) sent to the Supreme People's Procuracy of Vietnam and Phan Diễn (then-Secretary of Communist Party Committee of Danang) that Nguyễn Bá Thanh received bribes from Phạm Minh Thông (4.4 billion VND in total) in the construction projects of Hàn River Bridge and North-South Street in Danang. However, the case was eventually dropped. Vietnamese mass media (which, according to Human Rights Watch and Reporters Without Borders, are all strictly controlled by the government) were censored and even praised Thanh for his "many contributions" in the development of Da Nang City.

See also 
 Thuận Phước Bridge
 Dragon River Bridge

References

External links
 Han river bridge at midnight
 Han river Danang
 Bridge in Structurae Database

Road bridges in Vietnam
Bridges in Da Nang
Swing bridges
Cable-stayed bridges in Vietnam
Bridges completed in 2000